Julio César Valdivia Valle (born 5 June 1982 in León, Guanajuato) is a Mexican football goalkeeper who last played for Cruz Azul in the Primera Division de Mexico. He played for them in the 2008–09 CONCACAF Champions League.

Cruz Azul
Before joining the Cruz Azul he had already played for Club León in the second division and for Atletico San Francisco also from the second division.

References

External links
 
 

Living people
Sportspeople from León, Guanajuato
1982 births
Cruz Azul footballers
Footballers from Guanajuato
Mexican footballers
Association football goalkeepers